Chantal St-Cyr Hébert  (born 1954) is a Canadian journalist and political commentator.

Life and career
Hébert was born on April 24, 1954, in Ottawa, Ontario. She is the oldest of five children. In 1966 her family moved to Toronto where the 12-year-old was enrolled in École secondaire catholique Monseigneur-de-Charbonnel. She then attended Toronto's first public francophone high school, École secondaire Étienne-Brûlé. After high school, Hébert obtained a Bachelor of Arts degree in 1976 in political science from the bilingual Glendon College of York University. She is a Senior Fellow of Massey College at the University of Toronto.

Hébert began her media career in 1975 at the regional television and radio newsroom of the French-language Radio-Canada facility in Toronto. She eventually became their reporter covering provincial politics at Queen's Park. After Radio-Canada appointed Hébert to cover federal politics on Parliament Hill, she worked as bureau chief for Montreal's Le Devoir and La Presse. She has written columns appearing in The London Free Press, the Ottawa Citizen, and the National Post, and currently in Le Devoir, Metro, and the Toronto Star.

The "Lobster Pot" story
In the summer of 1995, Hébert broke the story in La Presse that the 1995 Quebec referendum question's guarantee of an offer of partnership with the rest of Canada before declaring sovereignty following a "Yes" vote was a sham. Hébert wrote that in a June 13 meeting with fifteen foreign diplomats, Quebec Premier Jacques Parizeau had stated that what mattered most was to get a majority vote from Quebec citizens for the proposal to secede from Canada because with that, Quebecers would be trapped "like lobsters thrown in boiling water" (in French: "comme des homards dans l'eau bouillante").

At the time, Parizeau was in France and in his place Quebec's deputy premier, Bernard Landry, who was not present at the meeting, declared categorically that the report was false. However, Hébert clarified her sources, stating that the information had been given to Foreign Affairs Canada in an official briefing by Jan Fietelaars, the Ambassador from the Netherlands who had been a participant at the meeting; in addition, she had backed up the claim by having it confirmed by three others: Ambassador Christian Fellens of Belgium, who was also present, and two other diplomatic attendees who spoke off the record. The remark hampered support for the "Yes" side as a result.

Pundit and author
Currently, Hébert is a national affairs writer with the Toronto Star as well as a guest columnist for Le Devoir and L'actualite. She appears frequently on CBC Television's The National as a member of the At Issue political panel hosted by Rosemary Barton alongside fellow panelists Andrew Coyne and Althia Raj. Hébert is also a regular participant in various other French and English-language television and radio current affairs programs.

Hébert received the 2005 Public Service Citation of the Association of Professional Executives of the Public Service of Canada (APEX). In February 2006, the Public Policy Forum voted her the Hyman Solomon Award for Excellence in Public Policy Journalism. She delivered the Michener Lecture at Queen's University in 2008.

In June 2006, Hébert took two months' leave of absence from the Toronto Star to write her first book, French Kiss: Stephen Harper's Blind Date with Quebec (Knopf Canada, February 2007). French Kiss received shortlist honours for the 2008 Edna Staebler Award for Creative Non-Fiction.

In September 2014, her second book was released, The Morning After: The 1995 Quebec Referendum and the Day that Almost Was (in French, Confessions post-référendaires: Les acteurs politiques de 1995 et le scénario d'un oui). The book, cowritten with Jean Lapierre, was a shortlisted nominee for the 2015 Shaughnessy Cohen Prize for Political Writing.

Honours and awards
She was invested as an Officer of the Order of Canada on 23 November 2012.

Honorary degrees

References

External links
Speakers Spotlight, Chantal Hébert – Political Raconteur & Columnist, biography, Retrieved November 22, 2012

1954 births
20th-century Canadian journalists
21st-century Canadian journalists
21st-century Canadian non-fiction writers
21st-century Canadian women writers
Canadian columnists
Canadian political commentators
Canadian political journalists
Canadian women journalists
Canadian women non-fiction writers
Franco-Ontarian people
Glendon College alumni
Living people
Officers of the Order of Canada
Toronto Star people
University of Toronto people
Canadian women columnists
Writers from Ottawa
Writers from Toronto
20th-century Canadian women writers